Paul Ernest Kell (July 8, 1915 – May 18, 1977) was a player in the National Football League.

Biography
Kell was born on July 8, 1915 in Princeton, Indiana. He graduated from University of Notre Dame in 1939. He died on May 18, 1977 at Luther Hospital, Eau Claire, Wisconsin. He was survived by his wife, his four sons, and his five grandchildren.

Career
Kell was drafted by the Green Bay Packers in the eighth round of the 1939 NFL Draft and played two seasons with the team. As such, he was a member of the 1939 NFL Champion Packers. 

He played at the collegiate level at the University of Notre Dame.

See also
List of Green Bay Packers players

References

External links

1915 births
1977 deaths
People from Princeton, Illinois
Green Bay Packers players
Western Conference Pro Bowl players
Notre Dame Fighting Irish football players
Players of American football from Illinois